Players' ages as of the tournament's opening day (2 July 2010).

Group A

Argentina
Head coach:  Enrique Tolcachier

China
Head coach:  Fan Bing

Egypt
Head coach:  Hesham Aboserea

Lithuania
Head coach:  Darius Dikcius

Serbia
Head coach:  Nenad Trunić

United States
Head coach:  Don Showalter

Group B

Australia
Head coach:  Guy Molloy

Canada
Head coach:  Roy Rana

Germany
Head coach:  Frank Menz

Korea
Head coach:  Seung Hwan Kim

Poland
Head coach:  Jery Szambelan

Spain
Head coach:  Diego Ocampo

References
Official site

Squads
FIBA